Steere is an English surname and it may refer to:

 Allen Steere (late 20th/early 21st c.), American professor of rheumatology
 Arthur Steere (1865–1943), American politician and businessman
 Dick Steere (rugby union) (1908–1967), New Zealand rugby union player
 Douglas V. Steere (1901–1995), American Quaker ecumenist
 Edward Steere (1828–1882), English bishop in Zanzibar and linguist
 Gene Steere (1872–1942), American baseball player
 Henry J. Steere (1830–1889), American philanthropist and industrialist
 Joseph Beal Steere (1842–1940), American ornithologist
 Joseph H. Steere (1852–1936), American jurist
 Richard Steere (author) (1643–1721), American merchant and poet
 Richard Steere (fencer) (1909–2001), American olympic fencer
 Robert Steere (1833–1910), American pioneer
 William C. Steere, Jr., chief executive officer of Pfizer
 William C. Steere (1907–1989), American botanist
 William Steere (priest) (died 1638), Irish Anglican priest

See also
 Lee Steere (surname)